Following the 2017 election, none of the two traditional blocs had a majority of seats. Local party Fælleslisten and regional Schleswig Party held 6 of the 31 seats, and both opted for supporting Erik Lauritsen from the Social Democrats to continue as mayor for his second term.

In this election, Fælleslisten lost representation, while the Schleswig Party lost 2 seats. However, once again, no bloc had a majority without the Schleswig Party. In the end, they stated that they would support the continuation of Erik Lauritsen as mayor. 

Sønderborg Municipality was the only municipality in the 2017 Danish local elections
where the Conservatives failed to win any seats.

Electoral system
For elections to Danish municipalities, a number varying from 9 to 31 are chosen to be elected to the municipal council. The seats are then allocated using the D'Hondt method and a closed list proportional representation.
Sønderborg Municipality had 31 seats in 2021

Unlike in Danish General Elections, in elections to municipal councils, electoral alliances are allowed.

Electoral alliances  

Electoral Alliance 1

Electoral Alliance 2

Electoral Alliance 3

Electoral Alliance 4

Results

Notes

References 

Sønderborg